Lei Chien-ying (born 17 April 1990)  is a Taiwanese archer. At the 2012 Summer Olympics she competed for her country in the women's team event and women's individual event. She also represented Chinese Taipei at the 2016 Summer Olympics in Rio de Janeiro winning a bronze medal in the women's team event, with Tan Ya-Ting and Lin Shih-Chia.

She has qualified for the 2020 Summer Olympics in the women's individual and team events.

References

External links
 

Taiwanese female archers
Living people
Olympic archers of Taiwan
Archers at the 2012 Summer Olympics
Archers at the 2016 Summer Olympics
Archers at the 2010 Asian Games
Archers at the 2014 Asian Games
Archers at the 2018 Asian Games
Medalists at the 2016 Summer Olympics
Olympic bronze medalists for Taiwan
Olympic medalists in archery
Universiade medalists in archery
Asian Games medalists in archery
Asian Games silver medalists for Chinese Taipei
Medalists at the 2018 Asian Games
Universiade bronze medalists for Chinese Taipei
World Archery Championships medalists
1990 births
Medalists at the 2017 Summer Universiade
Archers at the 2020 Summer Olympics
21st-century Taiwanese women